Mülheim can refer to:

 Mülheim an der Ruhr, a city in North Rhine Westphalia, Germany
 Mülheim, Cologne, a formerly independent town, that is now part of Cologne, Germany
 Mülheim an der Mosel, a municipality in Rhineland-Palatinate, Germany
 Mülheim-Kärlich, a municipality in Rhineland-Palatinate, Germany

Mülheim may also refer to:
 MV RMS Mülheim, cargo ship wrecked off Cornwall, 2003

Müllheim may refer to:
Müllheim, Germany
Müllheim, Switzerland